Nokia Business Center (NBC) was a mobile email solution by Nokia, providing push e-mail and (through a paid-for client upgrade) calendar and contact availability to mobile devices.

The server runs on Red Hat Enterprise Linux. It was discontinued in 2014.

External links
Press Release about support for IBM Lotus Notes and Domino addition to NBC

Nokia services
Mobile web